Rainbow Jelly is a 2018 Bengali language Indian food fantasy film for children, written and directed by Soukarya Ghosal and starring Sreelekha Mitra, Kaushik Sen, Shantilal Mukherjee and introducing Mahabrata Basu and Anumegha Banerjee. The story revolves around a young boy with marginal IQ whose life changes dramatically when he begins to experience the different expressions of food that fill the taste buds and have varied reactions on people who savour them.

Rainbow Jelly is the first-ever attempt in Food Fantasy Film genres, perhaps India’s first, made in Bengali language. The story of the film is an outcome of Ghosal's two years of research on Taste Theory & Ayurveda. The film won the Best Feature Film for Soukarya Ghosal at Hiralal Sen Award in 2019 from FFSI.

Plot 
The film based on a 12 years old orphan special child 'Ghoton', who is a magical cook. He is not sent to school and is captivated in his own dilapidated ancestral house by his only guardian 'Gondaria', his maternal uncle. Gondaria is a foodie & selfish character man who treats Ghoton like his servant. He always blackmails the boy saying that Ghoton's father who was an acclaimed scientist had left a treasure for his son. Only if Ghoton serves Gondaria till he turns 18 years, he can have the treasure. The innocent boy believes his uncle till a mysterious woman 'Poripishi'(aunt fairy) comes to him & claims, that she only can turn his dream of treasure true. That too within 7 days. For which she would secretly cook seven different dishes of food on behalf of Ghoton, of 7 different tastes ie, Sweet, Sour, Salty, Spicy, Pungent, Astringent & Bitter for the coming 7 days. With every taste & colour of the food Gondaria's mood changes accordingly. Sweet-Red dish makes him lovable. Sour-Orangy makes him repent. Salty-Yellow makes him contemplative. Spicy-Green makes him sad. Blue-Pungent makes him tense. Indigo-Astringent makes him hasty and the Bitter-Violet makes him angry. Finally, on the 8th day, Poripishi prepares a special dish with the residues of the prior seven dishes. This is a magical food - Rainbow Jelly which consists of all the tastes & colours of the universe. If anyone has it the person changes completely into a new human being. Ghoton serves that to Gondaria. After this a magical change occurs in Ghoton's life with which he not only discovers the hidden treasure of his father but also comes across the actual truth of his life. The truth that no one knew. The truth never could have been revealed if Rainbow Jelly wouldn't come into his life.

Cast

Soundtrack

The Music of the film is composed by Soukarya Ghosal, Nabarun Bose and Megh Banerjee. The sound design and mixing are done by Anindit Roy and Adeep Singh Manki. Out of six original songs, Soukarya Ghosal composed the title track music, Megh Banerjee composed music for Kosto Tumi. Nabarun Bose composed music for the rest of 4 songs. The soundtrack was released by Zee Music Company. The full music album was released in 2018.

All lyrics have been penned by Soukarya Ghosal.

Reception
The film was released on 25 June 2018 in India and received positive critical reviews. The Times of India gives 3.5 Critic's rating out of 5. 'Rainbow Jelly got 27 shows in the opening week' at Nandan, film and cultural centre in Kolkata, India. The film screened at the Hyderabad Bengali Film Festival at Prasad Labs on 23 June 2018 and bagged 5 awards.

The Bahrain Authority for Culture and Antiquities (formerly known as the Ministry of Culture and Information, Bahrain) headed by Shaikha Mai bint Mohammed Al-Khalifa, presented the film Rainbow Jelly on 7 July 2018 and the film was also screened at Nakhool Tent Cinema Hall- Arad Fort, Bahrain on 3 August 2018.

The film has been screened at prestigious film festivals in India, including 13th Habitat International Film Festival on 27 May 2018, Amaltas Hall at India Habitat Centre, New Delhi India. The film also screened at the first Pondicherry International Film Festival, Bengaluru Bengali Film Festival, 8th Kolkata Children Film Festival, Bay Area South Asian Film Festival (BASAFF), and at the Smile International Film Festival for Children & Youth at New Delhi, India.

The film was nominated in the Best Film (Bengali) category for the first-ever Critics Choice Film Awards, India, an initiative of the All India Film Critics Guild and All India Motion Content Group, the awards aim to recognise and honour the best of Indian Cinema.

Awards

References

External links 
 
 

2018 films
Bengali-language Indian films
2010s Bengali-language films
Films set in West Bengal
Films set in Kolkata